Cyrtodactylus nuaulu  is a species of gecko, a lizard in the family Gekkonidae. The species is endemic to Indonesia.

Etymology
The specific name, nuaulu, is in honor of the Nuaulu people.

Geographic range
C. nuaulu is found on Seram Island in Maluku Province, Indonesia.

References

Further reading
Oliver, Paul; Edgar, Paul; Mumpuni [sic]; Iskandar, Djoko T.; Lilley, Ron (2009). "A new species of bent-toed gecko (Cyrtodactylus: Gekkonidae) from Seram Island, Indonesia". Zootaxa 2115: 47-55. (Cyrtodactylus nuaulu, new species).

Cyrtodactylus
Reptiles described in 2009